Alexander Hugh Panton (20 March 1877 – 25 December 1951) was an Australian politician. He was a Labor member of the Western Australian Legislative Council from 1919 to 1922, before entering the Western Australian Legislative Assembly in 1924, representing Menzies. He transferred to Leederville in 1930 and served until 1951. From 1933 to 1938 he was Speaker of the Assembly.

References

1877 births
1951 deaths
Members of the Western Australian Legislative Council
Members of the Western Australian Legislative Assembly
Speakers of the Western Australian Legislative Assembly
Place of birth missing
Australian Labor Party members of the Parliament of Western Australia